The Invisible Maniac (also known as The Invisible Sex Maniac) is a 1990 American comedy horror film written and directed by Adam Rifkin (under the pseudonym "Rif Coogan") and starring Noel Peters and Shannon Wilsey.

Plot
A psychiatrist informs the mother (Marilyn Adams) of young Dornwinkle (Kris Russell) that he is a genius, but has the potential for madness and that with proper nurturing, he will be fine.  The mother catches her son peeping at a neighbor (Tracy Walker) undressing.  She berates him as a sexual deviant and that women are evil, traumatizing young Dornwinkle.
Twenty years later, Dornwinkle (Noel Peters), now a scientist that specializes in molecular reconstruction, provides a demonstration of his invisibility serum to a group of the world's most prestigious scientists.  The demonstration fails miserably and the scientists humiliate Dornwinkle.  Dornwinkle goes into a rage and murders four of them.  He is convicted of a quadruple homicide, but rather than being sent to prison, he is sent to a psychiatric hospital for the criminally insane.

After escaping from the hospital, Dornwinkle is hired as a substitute high school physics teacher under the pseudonym, Dr. Kevin Smith.  The students devise a plot to harass their new teacher, which Dornwinkle overhears.  Meanwhile, Dornwinkle continues to work on his invisibility serum, which he eventually achieves.  After taking the serum, Dornwinkle notes the effects it has on his dreams, fantasizing about the girls he teaches.
The students execute their plan to harass Dornwinkle, which further makes him angrier and angrier.  Mrs. Cello (Stephanie Blake), the principal of the school, who has already seduced one student, attempts to seduce Dornwinkle.  When he rebuffs her advancements, she threatens to fire him and call the police.  He then presumes to decide to accept her sexual proposal, but kills her instead with a letter opener.  This event, combined with the side effects of the invisibility serum, puts him over the edge and sends him on a killing spree. 
 
Now invisible, he kills Bubba (Eric Champnella) with a sandwich and Betty (Debra Lamb) with a fire hose.  Next, he kills Joan (Kalei Shallabarger) by drowning her in a fish tank and strangles April (Gail Lyon).  He then proceeds to kill Vicky (Shannon Wilsey) in the girls shower by throwing a radio into the water, electrocuting her, while Gordon (Rod Sweitzer) waits outside.  Gordon discovers Vicky's body and is assaulted and chased by Dornwinkle, who is still invisible.  Gordon is killed when he's thrown off the roof of the school.  After making love in Mrs. Cello's office, not noticing her dead body, Chet (Robert R. Ross, Jr.) and Bunny (Melissa Moore) discover Vicky's dead body in the girl's locker room.  They blame the mute janitor, Henry (Jason Logan Harris) and proceed to beat him up.  Dornwinkle attacks Chet and Bunny.  Chet initially gets the upperhand and Dornwinkle's visibility returns.  However, Dornwinkle is able to eventually overpower Chet and kills Bunny by repeatedly jumping on her body.  Presuming Chet to also be dead, Dornwinkle returns to his apartment.  Chet shows up with a shotgun, but Dornwinkle is able to inject himself with the invisibility serum and takes the gun away from Chet.  Chet finds the invisibility serum and injects himself.  Both invisible, they fight each other.  Someone is killed with the shotgun, blowing their entire head off.  The police arrive and assume Dornwinkle committed suicide, but it is revealed that it is Chet's body when Dornwinkle's serum wears off.

The film ends with newscaster Tammy Edwards (Dana Bentley) reporting the story of Dornwinkle's suicide and murder spree, but she is stripped naked by the invisible Dornwinkle, laughing hysterically.

Reception
In an interview for the E! True Hollywood Story documentary on the life of the actress, former boyfriend Billy Sheehan recounted how Wilsey felt humiliated during the film's premiere, feeling unsure whether the audience was laughing at her poor performance, or the character. Despite this reaction, she appeared in three more mainstream films before committing exclusively to pornography.

Cast
 Noel Peters as Kevin Dornwinkle
 Shannon Wilsey as Vicky
 Stephanie Blake as Mrs. Cello
 Melissa Moore as Bunny
 Clement von Franckenstein as Dr. McWaters
 Jason Logan Harris as Henry
 Robert R. Ross, Jr. as Chet
 Rod Sweitzer as Gordon
 Eric Champnella as Bubba
 Kalei Shallabarger as Joan
 Gail Lyon as April
 Debra Lamb as Betty
 Marilyn Adams as Mrs. Dornwinkle
 Dana Bentley as Tammy Edwards
 Matt Devlen as Officer O'Malley
 Anthony Markwell as Officer DeBoner
 Kris Russell as Young Kevin Dornwinkle
 Tracy Walker as Girl in Telescope
 Julie Strain as Girl in Henry's dream

References

External links
 

1990 films
1990s science fiction comedy films
American science fiction comedy films
Films directed by Adam Rifkin
Films about invisibility
Films based on The Invisible Man
1990 comedy films
1990s English-language films
1990s American films